Fedor Wilhelm Weinschenk (4 January 1916 – 22 June 1942) was a Polish alpine skier. He competed in the men's combined event at the 1936 Winter Olympics.

Weinschenk was of German ethnicity, competing for the local German Bielsko skiing club. During World War II, he was drafted to Wehrmacht and fought on the Eastern Front, where he was declared as missing on 22 June 1942. This was confirmed also by his family after the war.

References

External links
 

1916 births
1942 deaths
Polish male alpine skiers
Olympic alpine skiers of Poland
Alpine skiers at the 1936 Winter Olympics
Sportspeople from Bielsko-Biała
Polish people of German descent
German military personnel killed in World War II